This is a list of the horse breeds usually considered to be native to Japan.  Some may have complex or obscure histories, so inclusion here does not necessarily imply that a breed is predominantly or exclusively Japanese. In Japanese, this breed group is called "kokunaiuma".(domestic horse)

Breeds

Crossbreeds
There are also five crossbreeds that have been developed from existing breeds:
 Japanese Draft (日本輓系種)
 Japanese Sports Horse (日本スポーツホース種) - Equestrianism, general riding
 Japanese Riding Horse (日本乗系種) - Equestrianism, general riding
 Japanese Pony (日本ポニー種) - General riding
 Japanese Miniature Horse (日本ミニチュアホース) - Pet

Current crossbreed names were established in 2003, and the general breed classification "乗系種" (riding horse) was split into Sport Horse and "normal" riding horse.

There is also a sixth crossbreed definition, heavy crossbreed (輓交種), defined 2007 solely for the purpose of determining the proper registry for a foal.

See also
Extinct native Japanese horse breeds

Notes

References

Horse